Humayun Kabir Dhali is an author and journalist from Bangladesh.

Dhali has written 85 fiction and non-fiction stories, novels and children's books.

Dhali's first book, Mon Shudu mon Chuyesay, a love story, was published in 1991. Dusta Cheler Galpo is also a well-known Kishor novel.

Dhali's other novels including Tomar chokher jall, Dusta Cheler Galpo, 'Tiye Pakhir Janmadinay', 'Ekatturer Militari Voot', 'Kaker Cha kongkaboti', 'Katush Kutush', Lejkata Bugh o Rajkonna, Neel Graher Rohossho, Ek Jay chilo Hunggor, Bilay Nengti, Kalo Murti Rohossho, PitaPutra, Bilai Maw Kata Khow, 'Desh Bdesh er Rupkatha', and 'Rupkothar Rupmohol'.

Dhali's children's book Tiye Pakhir Janmadinay'''s, (On the Birthday of a Parrot) has been included in the curriculum of Keben primary school, Turkey. His another children book Cowboy and a Magic Mango Tree has been included in the curriculum of 9th State primary school of Yannitsa,  Greece. His science fiction book Neel Graher Rohossho'' has published by Nirmal Book Agency, Kolkata, India.

Book List
 একাত্তরের মিলিটারি ভূত [Ekatturer Military Voot]
 নীলগ্রহের রহস্য [Neel Groher Rohosya]
 কালোমূর্তি রহস্য [Kalomurti Rohosya]
 দুষ্টু ছেলের গল্প [Dusto Chheler Golpo]
 কিশোরসমগ্র [Kishoresomogro]
 টিয়ে পাখির জন্মদিনে [Tiye Pakhir Jonmodiney]
 ক্লাসমেট [Classmate]
 এক যে ছিল হাঙ্গর [Ek Je Chhilo Hangor]
 পরিকন্যা [Porikonya]
 লজিংবাড়ি [Lojingbari]
 জার্নি টু তাজমহল [Journey to Tajmohol]
 তোমার চোখের জল [Tomar Chokher Jol]
 আয় ফিরে যাই [Aai Firey jai]

Awards
 Atish Dipankar Gold Medal
 Meena Award 2012 by UNICEF
 Chokh Sahitya Award 2013, West Bengal, Kolkata
 M Nurul Kadir Shishusahitya Puruskar, 2013
 Kobi Sangsad Bangladesh Shishusahitya Puruskar
 Kobi Abu Jafar Ubaidullah Gold Medal
 Children & Women Foundation Medal
 Nawab Faijunnesa Gold Medal, 2008
 Salehin Memorial Award
 Lokchhora Foundation Sonmanona
 Podokhkhep Puruskar, 2014
 Sahitya Diganta Writer Award 2017
 Nikhil varat Sahitya Sanmanana, Tripura 2019

References

External links 
2.  arthonitiprotidin.com/2013/07/20/চোখ-সাহিত্য-পুরস্কার-পেল/

Bangladeshi male novelists
Bangladeshi journalists
Living people
1964 births
People from Chandpur District